Veerasundari is a 1954 Indian Tamil-language film produced by P. K. Batsha and directed by M. R. Ranganath. The film stars K. B. Janakiram and K. B. J. Sundarambal.

Cast
The list is adapted from the database of Film News Anandan.
K. B. Janakiram
K. B. J. Sundarambal
Sairam
Angamuthu
Kirupanidhi
Rajam
Stunt Somu
Kumari Rajam

Soundtrack
Music was composed by G. Ramanathan and Rathinavel Mudaliar. Only one song sung by A. M. Rajah and M. S. Rajeswari is available.

References

External links
 - Song from Veerasundari

1950s Tamil-language films
Films scored by G. Ramanathan